Kom-Kanas Mongolian Ethnic Township, generally known as Kom-Kanas, is a township of Burqin County, Altay Prefecture, Xinjiang Autonomous Region, People's Republic of China. The name derives from the two villages where most of the inhabitants live, Kom (township seat), and Kanas.

It is the northernmost township in Xinjiang and northwest China and the start of China National Highway 219. Kanas Lake is located entirely in the township.

The township is one of the few areas in China where Tuvans live and the Tuvan language is still spoken. However, no official census data about the Tuvan population is available, since they are an unrecognized ethnic group in China.

References

Altay Prefecture
Township-level divisions of Xinjiang
Ethnic townships of the People's Republic of China